Vasily Timofeyvich Gavrilov (born 6 March 1867) was an Imperial Russian division and corps commander. He fought in the war against the Japanese Empire. He was promoted to Polkovnik in 1905 and major general in 1911.

Awards
Order of Saint Stanislaus (House of Romanov), 2nd class, 1902
Order of Saint Anna, 2nd class, 1904
Order of Saint George, 4th degree, 1905
Order of Saint Vladimir, 4th class, 1905
Order of Saint Vladimir, 3rd class, 1909
Gold Sword for Bravery, 1904

Sources
 Русская императорская армия: Биографии
 Гаврилов, Василий Тимофеевич.

Russian military personnel of the Boxer Rebellion
Russian military personnel of the Russo-Japanese War
Russian military personnel of World War I
Recipients of the Order of Saint Stanislaus (Russian), 2nd class
Recipients of the Order of St. Anna, 2nd class
Recipients of the Order of St. Vladimir, 4th class
Recipients of the Order of St. Vladimir, 3rd class
Recipients of the Gold Sword for Bravery
1867 births
20th-century deaths
Year of death missing